Lillian Rumsey Bronson (October 21, 1902 - August 2, 1995) was an American character actress.

She performed in more than 80 films and 100 television productions.

Biography
Bronson was born in Lockport, New York, the daughter of a carriage builder, and attended the University of Michigan. During the Great Depression, Bronson and her sister, Dorothy, opened the Bronson Studio in New York, designing and making toy animals and pillows. In 1930 she made her debut on Broadway as the Exchange Operator in Louis Weitzenkorn's Five Star Final.

In 1943, Bronson appeared in the movie Happy Land as Mattie Dyer. Her television debut was the episode "The Druid Circle" of The Philco Television Playhouse, that aired on March 6, 1949, in the role of Miss Dagnall.

She appeared in four episodes of Perry Mason. She appeared as Clara Mayfield in the 1957 episode "The Case of the Sulky Girl" and as the judge in the 1958 episode "The Case of the Corresponding Corpse", the 1959 episode "The Case of the Shattered Dream", and the 1960 episode "The Case of the Clumsy Clown". In March of 1959, Bronson appeared in the Leave It To Beaver episode, "The Haunted House", as Miss Cooper. She appeared as Erma Bishop in the 1960 episode of The Andy Griffith Show "The Beauty Pageant".

Bronson's final movie appearance was in the film Kisses for My President (1964), in which she played the part of Miss Currier.

She then appeared in a long series of minor characters for many television series until the mid-1970s, including many western genres. She became widely known for her role as the grandmother in the Kings Row television series.

Bronson's final appearance on television was as "Grandma Nussbaum", Fonzie's grandmother, in the episode "Fonzie Moves In" of the ABC-TV sitcom series Happy Days, which aired on September 9, 1975.

Family/Personal life
Bronson was married to Henry Daniels Mygatt on New Year's Day 1936; they divorced on May 7, 1943; they did not have children.

Death and legacy
Bronson spent her last few years in Laguna Beach. She died in a  San Clemente, California, hospital on August 2, 1995.

"Old Woman of the Freeway" mural
In 1974, muralist Kent Twitchell chose a photo of Bronson to use as the model for a huge mural, titled "The Old Woman of the Freeway", to paint on a wall of a Downtown Los Angeles building which looked down from the Angeles Prince Hotel in Echo Park onto the Hollywood Freeway.  The original mural had been neglected by L.A. city officials, as a garage obscured the lower half and a billboard company had whitewashed the image in 1986. A partial restoration began in 1992. In 1994, a plan to rehang the mural outside the Valley Institute of Visual Arts in Sherman Oaks, California had died when a property owner refused to allow Twitchell access. In 1995, while being repainted after a legal settlement, the mural was covered with graffiti. In early 2016, Twitchell received approval from Los Angeles Valley College to repaint the mural. The $180,000 cost was raised by a voter-approved community colleges bond-building program.

Selected filmography
 Beauty on Parade (1950)
Spencer's Mountain (1963) - Grandma Spencer
Marnie (1964) - Mrs. Maitland (uncredited)

References

External links
 
 
 
 

1902 births
1995 deaths
American film actresses
American stage actresses
American television actresses
People from Lockport, New York
University of Michigan alumni